The Successor is a 1996 film directed by Rodoh Seji. The screenwriters were Satohiro Akimoto, Willard Carroll, and Rodoh Seji. It features Jason Connery as Peter Reardon and Laura Girling as Anna.

References

External links

1996 films
1996 thriller films
American thriller films
Films with screenplays by Willard Carroll
1990s English-language films
1990s American films